Josh Hadar is an American artist and sculptor. He is best known for his dynamic, moving works of art such as motorized bicycles in metal and glass.

Hadar's sculptural work continually evolves, earning an enthusiastic global audience and tremendous critical acclaim. Today he continues to explore the expressive potential of his medium from his Broome street studio, pushing the boundaries of structural form, fabrication technique and conceptual vision.

Artist statement
My sculptural creations are defined by their appropriation of, and radical departure from, the mundanity of familiar objects. A bicycle, a tree, a human heart – each with its own morphology or technology explored and exploded – becomes a platform for artistic discovery and aesthetic reinterpretation.

References

External links
 Wired.com

Living people
Year of birth missing (living people)
American sculptors